Monophadnoides rubi, the raspberry sawfly, is a species of common sawfly in the family Tenthredinidae.

References

Further reading

External links
The sawflies (Symphyta) of Britain and Ireland

 

Tenthredinidae
Insects described in 1845